Brachodes staudingeri is a moth of the family Brachodidae. It is found from European Russia to the eastern Palearctic realm, including Kyrgyzstan, the mountains of south-eastern Kazakhstan and north-western China.

The wingspan is about 31 mm for males and 22.5 mm for females. The forewings are grey with whitish-yellow scales. The hindwings are uniform grey. Adults have been recorded on wing from April to July.

Taxonomy
Records of Brachodes fallax from the European part of Russia as well as the eastern Palearctic ecozone were identified as a distinct species (Brachodes staudingeri) in 1998.

References

Moths described in 1998
Brachodidae